The Real Analysis Exchange (RAEX) is a biannual mathematics journal, publishing survey articles, research papers, and conference reports in real analysis and related topics. Its editor-in-chief is Paul D. Humke.

External links
 The website of RAEX

Mathematics journals